Wierzbno  is a village in Węgrów County, Masovian Voivodeship, in east-central Poland. It is the seat of the gmina (administrative district) called Gmina Wierzbno.

References

Wierzbno